Wasim Mohammed Saleh Abdalhadi (born 28 December 1982) is a Palestinian footballer who plays as a striker for  club Akhaa Ahli Aley.

Club career
Abdalhadi scored 12 goals in the 2020–21 Lebanese Second Division, and helped Sagesse gain promotion to the Lebanese Premier League. After having moved to Racing Beirut ahead of the 2021–22 Second Division, Abdalhadi finished the season once again with 12 goals; he was the joint-top scorer with Mazen Jammal of Ahli Saida.

Abdalhadi returned to the Lebanese Premier League on 13 July 2022, signing for Akhaa Ahli Aley.

Honours
Akhaa Ahli Aley
 Lebanese Challenge Cup: 2022

Individual
 Lebanese Second Division top goalscorer: 2021–22

Notes

References

External links
 
 
 
 

1982 births
Living people
People from Sidon
Palestinian footballers
Association football forwards
Islah Borj Al Shmali Club players
Al Ansar FC players
Safa SC players
Tadamon Sour SC players
Racing Club Beirut players
Shabab Al Sahel FC players
Bourj FC players
Sagesse SC footballers
Akhaa Ahli Aley FC players
Lebanese Premier League players
Lebanese Second Division players
Palestine international footballers
Palestinian expatriate footballers
Palestinian expatriate sportspeople in Lebanon
Expatriate footballers in Lebanon